A Secret Life may refer to:

 A Secret Life (film), a 1999 American film
 A Secret Life (album), a 1995 album by Marianne Faithfull
 A Secret Life (book), a 2011 book

See also 
 Secret Life (disambiguation)